Steel Venom may refer to:

Steel Venom (Valleyfair), an Impulse roller coaster located at Valleyfair in Shakopee, Minnesota.
Steel Venom (Geauga Lake), an Impulse roller coaster formerly located at Geauga Lake in Aurora, Ohio.  It is now known as Possessed at Dorney Park & Wildwater Kingdom in Allentown, Pennsylvania.